Charles Louis von Doussa (better known as Louis von Doussa; 17 May 1850 – 27 May 1932) was an Australian lawyer and politician. He was a member of the South Australian House of Assembly for Mount Barker from 1889 to 1902 and a member of the South Australian Legislative Council for the Southern District from 1903 to 1905. He was Attorney-General of South Australia and Minister for Education in the Jenkins government from 1903 to 1904.

History
Von Doussa was born in Hahndorf the second son of Emil Louis Alfred von Doussa (ca.1809 – 17 December 1882), an officer of the Prussian army, who emigrated to South Australia in 1846 with his wife Anna Dorothea von Doussa, née Schach. (ca.1811 – 17 March 1881)  He was educated at Hahndorf College and afterwards tutored privately by George R. Irvine, formerly a master at St. Peter's College.
On 11 June 1866 he was articled to J. J. Bonnar of Strathalbyn, and admitted to the bar in 1871. He began practice at Mount Barker in 1872.

Politics
Von Doussa represented the House of Assembly electoral district of Mount Barker from 1899 to 1902, then was defeated by a narrow majority when the Mount Barker, Noarlunga and Encounter Bay districts were merged into the electoral district of Alexandra. In December 1903 he was elected unopposed to the seat in the Legislative Council vacated when John Hannah Gordon was elevated to the bench of the Supreme Court of South Australia. He was appointed Attorney-General of South Australia and Minister of Education in the Jenkins Ministry, but relinquished both in 1904 when his health suffered. He retired from politics in 1905.

Law
In his 60 years as a lawyer, Von Doussa practised in the High Court, and in every jurisdiction of the Supreme and lower courts of the State. T. S. O'Halloran KC., William Edward Pyne, and S. B. von Doussa served their articles with him. He was appointed a Special Magistrate in 1927.

Other interests

He followed cricket avidly, and watched every Test Match played in Adelaide.
In his older years, Lawn Bowls was his chief sporting activity. He was president, then Patron, of the Mount Barker Bowling Club, and represented South Australia in Interstate matches. He was Patron of the Mount Barker Agricultural Society and Cricket Club. He was lay reader and churchwarden at the (Anglican) Christ Church, Mount Barker, and Church advocate in the Diocese of Adelaide from 1895 to 1916. He was a foundation member of the Mount Barker Institute. He was a close friend of Sir Lancelot Stirling.

Family
Alfred von Doussa (ca.1848 – 1 August 1926), businessman and politician, was a brother.

Louis von Doussa married Agnes Bowman (ca.1852 – 26 November 1886), daughter of William Bowman, on 16 April 1874; they had seven children, of which only four survived childhood. Agnes did not survive the eighth delivery. He married again on 17 March 1905, to Ruby Louisa Farrar, née Smythe (died 24 January 1920).
Francis Alfred "Frank" von Doussa (5 February 1875 – 31 October 1928) was manager of the Strathalbyn branch of Elder, Smith & Co
Stanley Bowman von Doussa (12 September 1877 – 13 November 1952) was a solicitor in Mannum for many years.
Ethel May von Doussa (10 January 1879 – )
Olive von Doussa (31 October 1882 – )

His grandson William Louis von Doussa also qualified as a lawyer.

References 

Lawyers from Adelaide
Members of the South Australian Legislative Council
1850 births
1932 deaths
People from Hahndorf, South Australia
Attorneys-General of South Australia
Australian people of German descent
Anglican lay readers